AUM Fidelity is an independent record label in New York City primarily devoted to avant-garde jazz artists such as William Parker, Matthew Shipp, and David S. Ware. It has also released recordings by improvisational rock band Shrimp Boat and exclusively distributes the CaseQuarter and Riti labels. It was founded in 1997 by former Homestead Records label manager Steven Joerg.

History
Founder Steven Joerg is a native of Chicago and has stated that in high school he was heavily influenced by the do-it-yourself (DIY) approach of punk rock, especially labels such as SST Records. Moving to New York City after graduating college, Joerg worked for Bar/None Records. He became a manager of the indie rock label Homestead Records in 1992, where he signed and promoted albums by Babe the Blue Ox, Tara Key, Sleepyhead, Soul-Junk, and others. After releasing a well-received album by free jazz drummer William Hooker, Joerg convinced a reluctant Homestead to sign notable jazz musician David S. Ware and his Quartet. Their first release on the label, Cryptology, received a lead review in Rolling Stone.

Joerg left Homestead in December 1996 and founded AUM Fidelity in Brooklyn in January 1997. His intent was to concentrate on modern jazz. He liquidated his savings, sold half his record collection, and took out a loan. The label derived its name partially from the Charles Mingus album Mingus Ah Um, but mostly from Om, the mantra representing the "soundless sound of the universe, the original tone and source of all creation". Not low fidelity or high fidelity, but AUM Fidelity." The label launched in September 1997 with the release of David S. Ware's Wisdom of Uncertainty, and William Parker's Sunrise in the Tone World.

AUM has released over 90 albums which have been acclaimed around the world. In addition to Ware and Parker, artists who have recorded for the label include Joe Morris, Whit Dickey, Other Dimensions in Music, Test, Farmers by Nature, Matthew Shipp, Mat Maneri, Hamid Drake, Rob Brown, Daniel Carter, Roy Campbell, Cooper-Moore, Chad Taylor, Roy Nathanson, Kidd Jordan, Eri Yamamoto, Gerald Cleaver, Craig Taborn, Bill Dixon, Jim Hobbs/The Fully Celebrated, Darius Jones, Little Women, Mike Pride, and others. AUM Fidelity began distributing Joe Morris' Riti label in 2002. In 2003 it co-launched the CaseQuarter label, which is devoted to gospel music of the American south.

AUM Fidelity has supported the New York City downtown jazz scene. Joerg has volunteered at the Vision Festival since 1996 and produced Vision One, a two-disc benefit compilation of material recorded at the festival. AUM Fidelity was asked by musician and artist John Zorn to curate his avant-garde locale The Stone for June 16–30, 2011, which featured performances by many of the label's artists, including its then most recent signing, alto saxophonist/composer Darius Jones. In January 2009, the label was instrumental in finding a kidney donor for David S. Ware. Following his recovery and prior to his passing, Ware released five  new albums with the label, including a recording of his final concert appearance, Live at Jazzfestival Saalfelden 2011. Setsuko S. Ware, David Ware's widow, and Joerg produced the Memorial Service for David S. Ware, which took place on January 7, 2013.

AUM Fidelity celebrated its 15th anniversary in June 2011 with two weeks of curated performances at the Stone, and culminated with a series of concerts in June 2012 at Suoni Per Il Popolo (Montreal) and Vision Festival (New York City). William Parker's 8-CD box set, Wood Flute Songs, was produced the following year and released in late 2013, garnering a 5-star review in Down Beat  and chosen as the No.1 Archive Release of the Year by The Wire. AUM continues to produce new recordings, and in 2015 launched the David S. Ware Archive Series (DSW-ARC) with a fully remixed & wholly expanded edition of Ware's first (1977) recordings as a bandleader, Birth of a Being.

Discography
 AUM001 – 1997: Wisdom of Uncertainty by David S. Ware (Quartet)
 AUM002/3 – 1997: Sunrise in the Tone World by William Parker (and The Little Huey Creative Music Orchestra)
 AUM004 – 1997: Antennae by Joe Morris (Trio)
 AUM005 – 1998: Transonic by Whit Dickey (Trio)
 AUM006 – 1998: Now! by Other Dimensions in Music (Roy Campbell, Daniel Carter, William Parker, Rashid Bakr)
 AUM007/8 – 1998: Vision One: Vision Festival 1997 Compiled by Various Artists
 AUM009 – 1998: A Cloud of Black Birds by Joe Morris (Quartet)
 AUM010/11 – 1998: The Peach Orchard by William Parker (In Order to Survive)
 AUM012 – 1999: Test by Test (Tom Bruno, Sabir Mateen, Matthew Heyner, Daniel Carter
 AUM013 – 2000: Time Is of the Essence Is Beyond Time by Other Dimensions in Music (Roy Campbell, Daniel Carter, William Parker, Rashid Bakr, with special guest Matthew Shipp)
 AUM014 – 2000: Soul Search by Joe Morris & Mat Maneri
 AUM015/16 – 2000: Mayor of Punkville by William Parker (& The Little Huey Creative Music Orchestra)
 AUM017 – 2001: Piercing the Veil by William Parker & Hamid Drake
 AUM018 – 2001: Singularity by Joe Morris
 AUM019 – 2001: Corridors & Parallels by David S. Ware (Quartet)
 AUM020 – 2001: Life Cycle by The Nommonsemble (Whit Dickey, Rob Brown, Mat Maneri, Matthew Shipp)
 AUM021 – 2002: Black Cherry by Organic Grooves (dub remix/remake/remodel of AUM017)
 AUM022 – 2002: O'Neal's Porch by William Parker (Quartet)
 AUM023 – 2002: Freedom Suite by David S. Ware (Quartet)
 AUM024 – 2002: Going to Church by Maneri Ensemble (Joe Maneri, Mat Maneri, Matthew Shipp, Roy Campbell, Barre Phillips, Randy Peterson)
 AUM025 – 2003: Luminescence by Daniel Carter & Reuben Radding
 AUM026 – 2003: Skin by Daughter (this NYC punk rock band's one album)
 AUM027 – 2004: {a sampler of} Something Grand by Shrimp Boat (promotion–only CD for the Box Set)
 AUM028–31– 2004: Something Grand [Box Set] by Shrimp Boat
 AUM033 – 2005: Speckly by Shrimp Boat (CD issue of their 1989 LP debut)
 AUM034 – 2005: Sound Unity by William Parker (Quartet)
 AUM035 – 2005: The Beautiful by Triptych Myth (Cooper-Moore, Chad Taylor, Tom Abbs)
 AUM036 – 2006: Long Hidden: The Olmec Series by William Parker (& The Olmec Group)
 AUM037 – 2006: Sotto Voce by Roy Nathanson
 AUM038 – 2006: Palm of Soul by Kidd Jordan, Hamid Drake, William Parker
 AUM039/40 – 2007: First Communion + Piercing the Veil by William Parker & Hamid Drake
 AUM041 – 2007: Summer Snow by William Parker & Hamid Drake
 AUM042 – 2007: Renunciation by David S. Ware (Quartet)
 AUM043 – 2007: Corn Meal Dance by William Parker (Raining on the Moon)
 AUM044 – 2008: Crown Trunk Root Funk by Rob Brown Ensemble (with Craig Taborn, William Parker, Gerald Cleaver)
 AUM045 – 2008: Akhenaten Suite by Roy Campbell Ensemble (with Billy Bang +++)
 AUM046 – 2008: 17 Musicians in Search of a Sound: Darfur by Bill Dixon (Orchestra)
 AUM047 – 2008: Double Sunrise Over Neptune by William Parker (Orchestra)
 AUM048 – 2008:  Duologue by Eri Yamamoto (with Daniel Carter, Hamid Drake, William Parker, Federico Ughi)
 AUM049 – 2008: Redwoods by Eri Yamamoto (Trio)
 AUM050 – 2008: Petit Oiseau by William Parker (Quartet)
 AUM051 – 2008: The Cedar Box Recordings by Cooper–Moore
 AUM052 – 2009: Shakti by David S. Ware (with Joe Morris, William Parker, Warren Smith)
 AUM053 – 2009: Farmers by Nature by Gerald Cleaver, William Parker, Craig Taborn
 AUM054 – 2009: Drunk on the Blood of the Holy Ones by The Fully Celebrated (Jim Hobbs, Timo Shanko, Django Carranza)
 AUM056 – 2009: Wildlife by Joe Morris, Petr Cancura, Luther Gray
 AUM057 – 2009: Man'ish Boy (A Raw & Beautiful Thing) by Darius Jones (Trio)
 AUM058 – 2009: Today on Earth by Joe Morris (Quartet)
 AUM059 – 2010: In Each Day, Something Good by Eri Yamamoto (Trio)
 AUM060 – 2010: Saturnian (Solo Saxophones, Volume 1) by David S. Ware
 AUM061 – 2010:  Throat by Little Women
 AUM062/63 – 2010: I Plan to Stay a Believer by William Parker (& large ensemble)
 AUM064 – 2010: Onecept by David S. Ware (with William Parker, Warren Smith)
 AUM065 – 2010: Betweenwhile by Mike Pride's From Bacteria To Boys
 AUM066 – 2011: Cosmic Lieder by Darius Jones & Matthew Shipp
 AUM067 – 2011: Out of This World's Distortions by Farmers by Nature (Gerald Cleaver, William Parker, Craig Taborn)
 AUM068 – 2011: Planetary Unknown by David S. Ware (with Cooper-Moore, William Parker, Muhammad Ali)
 AUM069 – 2011: Big Gurl (Smell My Dream) by Darius Jones (Trio)
 AUM070 – 2011: Organica by David S. Ware
 AUM071 – 2012: The Next Page by Eri Yamamoto (Trio)
 AUM072 – 2012: Book of Mæ'bul (Another Kind of Sunrise) by Darius Jones (Quartet)
 AUM073 – 2012: Altitude by Joe Morris, William Parker, Gerald Cleaver
 AUM074 – 2012: Live at Jazzfestival Saalfelden 2011 by David S. Ware (with Cooper-Moore, William Parker, Muhammad Ali)
 AUM075 – 2012: Grass Roots by Grass Roots (Sean Conly, Alex Harding, Darius Jones, Chad Taylor)
 AUM076 – 2013: Lung by Little Women
 AUM077 – 2013: Birthing Days by Mike Pride's From Bacteria to Boys
 AUM078 – 2013: Drummer's Corpse by Mike Pride
 AUM079 – 2013: Firefly by Eri Yamamoto (Trio)
 AUM080–87 – 2013: Wood Flute Songs [Box Set] by William Parker (Quartet/Quintet/Sextet/Septet/Ensemble)
 AUM088 – 2014: The Darkseid Recital by Darius Jones & Matthew Shipp
 AUM089/90 – 2014: Love and Ghosts by Farmers by Nature (Gerald Cleaver, William Parker, Craig Taborn)
 AUM091 – 2014: The Oversoul Manual by Darius Jones (featuring The Elizabeth–Caroline Unit)
 AUM092/93/94 – 2015: For Those Who Are, Still [Box Set] by William Parker (& four different ensembles)
 AUM095 – 2015: Le bébé de Brigitte (Lost in Translation) by Darius Jones (Quartet+)
 AUM096/97 (DSW-ARC01) – 2015: Birth of a Being (Expanded) by David S. Ware (Agogee trio with Cooper-Moore, Marc Edwards)
 AUM098 – 2015: Great Spirit by William Parker (Raining On The Moon)
 AUM099 – 2016: Life by Eri Yamamoto (Trio)
 AUM100 (DSW-ARC02) – 2016: Live in Sant'Anna Arresi, 2004 by David S. Ware & Matthew Shipp
 AUM101 – 2017: Vessel in Orbit by Whit Dickey, Mat Maneri, Matthew Shipp
 AUM102/103 (DSW-ARC03) – 2017: Live in New York, 2010 by David S. Ware Trio (with William Parker, Warren Smith)
 AUM104/105 – 2017: Meditation/Resurrection by William Parker Quartets (with Cooper-Moore, Rob Brown, Hamid Drake, Jalalu-Kalvert Nelson)
 AUM106 – 2018: Seraphic Light by Daniel Carter, William Parker, Matthew Shipp
 AUM107 (DSW-ARC04) – 2018: The Balance (Vision Festival XV +) by David S. Ware Trio (with William Parker, Warren Smith)
 AUM108/109 – 2019: Peace Planet & Box of Light by Whit Dickey Tao Quartets (with R. Brown, M. Shipp, W. Parker, S. Swell, M. Bisio)
 AUM110/111 – 2019: Live/Shapeshifter by William Parker / In Order To Survive (with Rob Brown, Cooper-Moore, Hamid Drake)
 AUM112 – 2019: Goshu Ondo Suite by Eri Yamamoto Trio & Choral Chameleon
 AUM113 (DSW-ARC05) – 2019: Théâtre Garonne, 2008 by David S. Ware New Quartet (with Joe Morris, William Parker, Warren Smith)
 AUM114 – 2020: New World Order b/w Soledad by William Parker Ensembles featuring Leena Conquest
 AUM115 – 2021: Mayan Space Station by William Parker (trio with Ava Mendoza & Gerald Cleaver)
 AUM116 – 2021: Painters Winter by William Parker (trio with Daniel Carter & Hamid Drake)

Centering Records (William Parker & AUM Fidelity cooperative productions)
 CENT1004 – 2010: Uncle Joe's Spirit House by William Parker (Organ Quartet)
 CENT1005/6/7 – 2011: Crumbing in the Shadows Is Fraulein Miller's Stale Cake [Box Set] by William Parker
 CENT1008/9 – 2012: Essence of Ellington by William Parker (Orchestra)
 CENT1012 – 2016: Stan's Hat Flapping in the Wind by William Parker performed by Cooper–Moore & Lisa Sokolov
 CENT1013 – 2017: Bass Duo by William Parker & Stefano Scodanibbio
 CENT1015/16/17 – 2018: Voices Fall From The Sky [Box Set] by William Parker
 CENT1018/19 – 2018: Flower in A Stained-Glass Window & The Blinking of The Ear by William Parker
 CENT1020-ADV – 2020: Trencadís [a selection from Migration of Silence Into and Out of The Tone World] by William Parker
 CENT1020-1029 – 2021: Migration of Silence Into and Out of The Tone World [Box Set] by William Parker (Various Ensembles)

CaseQuarter (co–launched & distributed by AUM Fidelity; dedicated to sacred music of the American South)
 CASE101 – 2003: God's Got It: The Legendary Booker and Jackson Singles by Reverend Charlie Jackson
 CASE102 – 2004: You Without Sin, Cast the First Stone by Isaiah Owens
 CASE103 – 2006: Singing Songs of Praise by The Spiritualaires of Hurtsboro, Alabama
 CASE104 – 2009:  I Got Two Wings: Incidents and Anecdotes of The Two–Winged Preacher and Electric Guitar Evangelist [Book+CD] by Elder Utah Smith (book by Lynn Abbott)

See also 
 List of record labels

References

Further reading

External links 

Aum Fidelity
Aum Fidelity
Aum Fidelity